Boot Camp Assistant is a multi boot utility included with Apple Inc.'s macOS (previously ) that assists users in installing Microsoft Windows operating systems on Intel-based Macintosh computers. The utility guides users through non-destructive disk partitioning (including resizing of an existing HFS+ or APFS partition, if necessary) of their hard disk drive or solid-state drive and installation of Windows device drivers for the Apple hardware. The utility also installs a Windows Control Panel applet for selecting the default boot operating system.

Initially introduced as an unsupported beta for Mac OS X 10.4 Tiger, the utility was first introduced with Mac OS X 10.5 Leopard and has been included in subsequent versions of the operating system ever since. Previous versions of Boot Camp supported Windows XP and Windows Vista. Boot Camp 4.0 for Mac OS X 10.6 Snow Leopard version 10.6.6 up to Mac OS X 10.8 Mountain Lion version 10.8.2 only supported Windows 7. However, with the release of Boot Camp 5.0 for Mac OS X 10.8 Mountain Lion in version 10.8.3, only 64-bit versions of Windows 7 and Windows 8 are officially supported.

Boot Camp 6.0 added support for 64-bit versions of Windows 10. Boot Camp 6.1, available on macOS 10.12 Sierra and later, will only accept new installations of Windows 7 and later; this requirement was upgraded to requiring Windows 10 for macOS 10.14 Mojave.

Boot Camp is currently not available on Apple silicon Macs. Via virtualization, it is possible to run ARM-based Windows 10 and 11 (only Windows Insider builds, as they are the only publicly available ARM builds of Windows) through the QEMU emulator and Parallels Desktop virtualization software, which also allows Linux.

Overview

Installation 
Setting up Windows 10 on a Mac requires an ISO image of Windows 10 provided by Microsoft. Boot Camp combines Windows 10 with install scripts to load hardware drivers for the targeted Mac computer.

Boot Camp currently supports Windows 10 on a range of Macs dated mid-2012 or newer. Apple Silicon is not supported due to being ARM-based. Although Windows 11 supports ARM64, the ARM64 version is only licensed to OEMs, and there are no M1/M2 drivers, so it cannot run on Apple Silicon Macs.

Startup Disk 
By default, Mac will always boot from the last-used startup disk. Holding down the option key (⌥) at startup brings up the boot manager, which allows the user to choose which operating system to start the device in. When using a non-Apple keyboard, the alt key usually performs the same action. The boot manager can also be launched by holding down the "menu" button on the Apple Remote at startup.

On older Macs, its functionality relies on BIOS emulation through EFI and a partition table information synchronization mechanism between GPT and MBR combined.

On newer Macs, Boot Camp keeps the hard disk as a GPT so that Windows is installed and booted in UEFI mode.

Requirements

Mac OS X 10.7 Lion and OS X 10.8 Mountain Lion
Apple's Boot Camp system requirements lists the following requirements for Mac OS X Lion and OS X Mountain Lion:

 8 GB USB storage device, or external drive formatted as MS-DOS (FAT) for installation of Windows drivers for Mac hardware
 20 GB free hard disk space for a first-time installation or 40 GB for an upgrade from a previous version of Windows
 A full version of one of the following operating systems:
 Windows 7 Home Premium, Professional, or Ultimate (64-bit editions only)
 Windows 8 and Windows 8 Professional (64-bit editions only)
 Windows 10 Home, Pro, Pro for Workstation, Education or Enterprise (64-bit editions only)

Mac OS X 10.5 Leopard and Mac OS X 10.6 Snow Leopard
Apple lists the following requirements for Mac OS X 10.5 Leopard and Mac OS X 10.6 Snow Leopard:

 An Intel-based Macintosh computer with the latest firmware (Early Intel-based Macintosh computers require an EFI firmware update for BIOS compatibility).
 A Mac OS X 10.5 Leopard or Mac OS X 10.6 Snow Leopard installation disc or Mac OS X Disc 1 included with Macs that have Mac OS X 10.5 Leopard or Mac OS X 10.6 Snow Leopard preinstalled; this disc is needed for installation of Windows drivers for Mac hardware
 10 GB free hard disk space (16 GB is recommended for Windows 7)
 A full version of one of the following operating systems:
 Windows XP Home Edition or Windows XP Professional Edition  with Service Pack 2 or higher (32-bit editions only)
 Windows Vista Home Basic, Home Premium, Business, Enterprise or Ultimate (32-bit and 64-bit editions)
 Windows 7 Home Premium, Professional, Enterprise or Ultimate (32-bit and 64-bit editions)

Supported Macintosh computers with Windows 8
Officially, the earliest Macintosh models that support Windows 8 are the mid-2011 MacBook Air, 13-inch-mid-2011 or 15 and 17-inch-mid-2010 MacBook Pro, mid-2011 Mac Mini,  21-inch-mid-2011 or 27-inch-mid-2010 iMac, and early 2009 Mac Pro. By running the Boot Camp assistant with a compatible version of Microsoft Windows setup disc in the drive and switching to a Windows 8 disc when Mac OS X reboots the machine to begin installing Windows, Windows 8 can be installed on older unsupported hardware. This can also work with Windows 10.

Limitations
 Boot Camp will only help the user partition their disk if they currently have only a primary HFS partition, an EFI System Partition, and a Mac OS X Recovery Partition. Thus, for example, it is not possible to maintain an additional storage partition. A workaround has been discovered that involves interrupting the standard procedure after creating the Boot Camp partition, resizing the primary Mac OS X partition and creating a third partition in the now available space, then continuing with the Windows install. Changes to the partition table after Windows is installed are officially unsupported, but can be achieved with the help of third-party software.
 Boot Camp does not help users install Linux, and does not provide drivers for it. Most methods for dual-booting with Linux on Mac rely on manual disk partitioning, and the use of an EFI boot manager such as rEFInd.
 Despite Macs transitioning to Thunderbolt 3 in 2016, Boot Camp does not currently support running Windows with a Thunderbolt 3-powered External GPU (eGPU) unit under macOS High Sierra, macOS Mojave or macOS Catalina. Apple has not publicly commented on why this limitation is in place.

Boot Camp version history

Boot Camp support software (for Windows) version history

See also

Parallels Desktop for Mac
rEFIt and rEFInd
VMware Fusion
VirtualBox

References

External links

Boot Camp support page and installation instructions
Using the Apple Bluetooth Wireless Keyboard in Boot Camp
Troubleshooting Internet Connectivity Issues on Boot Camp with Windows 8

2006 software
Apple Inc. file systems
Apple Inc. software
Boot loaders